Iveagh Upper, Lower Half is the name of a barony in County Down, Northern Ireland. It was created by 1851 with the division of the barony of Iveagh Upper into two. It lies in the centre of the county, and is bordered by six other baronies: Iveagh Upper, Upper Half and Lordship of Newry to the west; Mourne to the south; Kinelarty and Lecale Upper to the east; and  Iveagh Lower, Upper Half to the north.

List of settlements
Below is a list of the villages and population centres in Iveagh Upper, Lower Half:

Towns
Newcastle
Castlewellan

Villages
Annsborough
Bryansford
Dromara
Hilltown
Kilcoo
Leitrim
Waringsford

Population centres
Katesbridge

List of civil parishes
Below is a list of civil parishes in Iveagh Upper, Lower Half:
Aghaderg (one townland, rest in baronies of Iveagh Lower, Lower Half and Iveagh Upper, Upper Half)
Clonduff (also partly in barony of Iveagh Upper, Upper Half (one townland))
Dromara (also partly in baronies of Iveagh Lower, Lower Half and Kinelarty)
Drumballyroney
Drumgooland (also partly in barony of Iveagh Lower, Lower Half (one townland)) 
Garvaghy (also partly in barony of Iveagh Lower, Lower Half)
Kilbroney (one townland, rest in barony of Iveagh Upper, Upper Half) 
Kilmegan (also partly in baronies of Kinelarty and Lecale Upper)
Maghera
Newry (one townland, rest in baronies of Lordship of Newry, Oneilland West and Orior Upper)

References